Penicillium allahabadense is an anamorph species of the genus of Penicillium which produces rugulosin.

See also
List of Penicillium species

References

Further reading

 
 
 
 

allahabadense
Fungi described in 1962